is a Japanese tarento, free announcer, and singer.

Miyajima is represented with Watanabe Entertainment. She graduated from Tokyo Metropolitan Ryōgoku High School and Kyoritsu Women's University.

Current appearances

TV series

Radio

Narration

Former appearances

During college

As a KBC announcer 
TV series

Radio

After affiliating with Watanabe Entertainment 
TV series

Radio

Internet

Stage

Discography

CD

Original video narration

Choruses

Unreleased

References

External links 
 

Japanese radio personalities
Japanese female models
Anime singers
1983 births
Living people
Singers from Tokyo
21st-century Japanese singers